Volk Volk Tour London CC Club 16.04.2007 is a special limited edition 2 CD live album by the Slovenian industrial/techno music group Laibach. The album is a full recording of the band's live show in London at CC Club on 16 April 2007. CD1 contains the first part of the concert with songs from Laibach's album Volk (except for the track "Vaticanae"). CD2 contains a mix of other songs, mostly from the album WAT.

Track listing
CD1:
 Germania
 America
 Anglia
 Rossiya
 Francia (part 1)
 Francia (part 2)
 Italia
 España
 Yisra’el
 Türkiye
 Zhonghuá
 Nippon
 Slovania
 NSK
CD2:
 Tanz mit Laibach
 Alle gegen Alle
 Du bist Unser
 Hell: Symmetry
 Achtung!
 Das Spiel ist Aus
 Turbo-Volk Mix (by iTurk)

Personnel
 Laibach are Eber, Saliger, Dachauer & Keller
 Keyboards: Primož Hladnik, Luka Jamnik
 Drums: Janez Gabrič
 Percussion and backing vocals: Eva Breznikar, Natasa Ragovec
 Special guest on vocal and synth: Mina Špiler
 Special ghost appearance: Boris Benko
 Sound engineer: Grant Austin
 Light engineer: Jernej Gustin
 Technical director: Gregor Musa
 Technical assistant: Damjan Bizilj
 Merchandising: Miha Mohorko
 Film and videos: Akasa Boljič, Neja Engelsberger, Sašo Podgoršek & Dekaos
 Bus driver: Andrej Romberg
 Ground transport: Kultour Coach Company
 Laibach agency: IBD Waltz/Scholtz GBR
 Special thanks: Silence, Melodrom, ake up 2
 CC Club General Manager: Neal Sanders
 Recorded by: Will Shapland for Live Here Now and Will Shapland Mobiles
 Assisted by: David Loudoun, Chris Goddard, Joe Adams, Andy Rana, Saxon, Noggin, Iain Forsyth, MJ
 With thanks to: Robert Schilling
 Label: Live Here Now

Laibach (band) albums
Silence (band) albums
2007 live albums
Industrial albums by Slovenian artists